Aberrant Worldwide Phase I is a 2000 role-playing game supplement for Aberrant published by White Wolf Publishing.

Contents
Aberrant Worldwide Phase I is a supplement in which a setting book and metaplot adventure book updates the time frame in which the world is set.

Reception
Aberrant Worldwide Phase I was reviewed in the online second version of Pyramid which said "The adventure design allows a GM to involve PCs from the most loyal Utopian to the most radical Terat to take roughly the same course through the adventure (and to desire roughly the same outcome), maximizing utility to all gaming groups while keeping the complexity from being unwieldy. For better or worse, this generally means that Aberrant Worldwide Phase II drags the setting even further into the realm of conspiracy gaming."

Reviews
Backstab #24

References

Role-playing game books
Role-playing game supplements introduced in 2000